Sarah Wixey (born 10 June 1970) is a Welsh sport shooter. She competed in the women's trap event at the 2018 Commonwealth Games, winning the bronze medal.

References

1970 births
Living people
Welsh female sport shooters
Place of birth missing (living people)
Shooters at the 2014 Commonwealth Games
Shooters at the 2018 Commonwealth Games
Commonwealth Games bronze medallists for Wales
Commonwealth Games medallists in shooting
British female sport shooters
Medallists at the 2018 Commonwealth Games